Requiem and Silence (stylized in all caps) is the fifth greatest hits album by Japanese singer-songwriter Chihiro Onitsuka. It was released on February 20, 2020 through Victor Entertainment. The album was released in three different editions, standard and limited, and premium collector's edition. The album includes a new track: "Kakikake no Tegami".

Track listing

Charts

Release history

References

External links
Official website

2020 greatest hits albums
Victor Entertainment compilation albums
Pop compilation albums
Chihiro Onitsuka albums
Japanese-language compilation albums